= M. J. Mulkey =

Arkansas state senator and physician

M. J. Mulkey (died February 1882) was a state senator in Arkansas. He served in 1877 and 1879 representing Little River, Sevier, Howard, and Polk counties.

In 1874 he was documented as part of the medical profession, a member of the Medical Society of Hempstead County, and working in Mineral, Arkansas.
